The women's tournament of the 2017 FIBA 3x3 World Cup host in Nantes, France, was attended by 20 teams.

Participating teams
Every FIBA zone except FIBA Africa were represented. The top 20 teams, including the hosts, based on the FIBA National Federation ranking qualified for the tournament as of 01.03.2017.

FIBA Asia (6)
  (14)
  (12)
  (15)
  (18)
  (17)
  (16)

FIBA Africa (0)
 None

FIBA Oceania (1)
  (20)

FIBA Americas (2)
  (13)
  (19)

FIBA Europe (11)
  (11)
  (5)
  (2) (hosts)
  (9)
  (1)
  (4)
  (3)
  (8)
  (10)
  (7)
  (6)

Players

Main tournament

Preliminary round

Pool A

Pool B

Pool C

Pool D

Knockout stage

Final standings

Individual contests

Skills contest

Qualification
Format
One player from each women's team was eligible to enter the Skills contest. In the qualification stage, each player were to perform a set of basketball moves and skills from a starting line at a side of the player's choosing:

Hit Corner Shot after the "Go" signal is made
Dribble through a slalom through four cones
Make a straight pass into a target
Dribble through a second slalom with 2 balls forwards then backwards
Make a straight pass
Make a third dribble through the slalom
Score a basket.

The four fastest women who were able to perform the tasked required qualified for the final round. A time limit of 45 seconds was given. In the case of a tie, the tied players would have to do the same run again.

Results

Final
Format
The format used in the qualification round is used once again but this time the players face each other head to head with the best player from the qualification playing against the fourth best and the second best player playing against the third.

Results

Awards
Team of the Day
June 17: 

Game of the Day
June 18:  18–8 

 MVP of tournament
  Anna Leshkovtseva

References

External links
Official website

Women's
FIBA Women's 3x3 World Cup
2017 in women's basketball
2017 in French women's sport
International women's basketball competitions hosted by France